WMAV may refer to:

 WMAV-FM, a radio station (90.3 FM) licensed to Oxford, Mississippi, United States
 WMAV-TV, a television station (channel 18) licensed to Oxford, Mississippi, United States
 Muar Airport, in Muar, Johor, Malaysia (ICAO code WMAV)
 World's Most Amazing Videos